Murestaneh (also Romanized as Mūrestāneh; also known as Mūrestāneh-ye-Qāzī Bolāghī, Muristāneh, and Muristanekh) is a village in Dast Jerdeh Rural District, Chavarzaq District, Tarom County, Zanjan Province, Iran. At the 2006 census, its population was 210, in 54 families.

References 

Populated places in Tarom County